The 1954–55 FA Cup was the 74th season of the world's oldest football cup competition, the Football Association Challenge Cup, commonly known as the FA Cup. Newcastle United won the competition for the sixth time, beating Manchester City 3–1 in the final at Wembley.

Matches were scheduled to be played at the stadium of the team named first on the date specified for each round, which was always a Saturday. Some matches, however, might be rescheduled for other days if there were clashes with games for other competitions or the weather was inclement. If scores were level after 90 minutes had been played, a replay would take place at the stadium of the second-named team later the same week. If the replayed match was drawn further replays would be held until a winner was determined. If scores were level after 90 minutes had been played in a replay, a 30-minute period of extra time would be played.

Calendar

First round proper

At this stage clubs from the Football League Third Division North and South joined those non-league clubs having come through the qualifying rounds (except Crook Town and Bishop Auckland that given byes to this round). Matches were scheduled to be played on Saturday, 20 November 1954. Seven were drawn and went to replays, with one of these going to a second replay.

Second round proper
The matches were scheduled for Saturday, 11 December 1954. Four matches were drawn, with replays taking place later the same week.

Third round proper
The 44 First and Second Division clubs entered the competition at this stage. The matches were scheduled for Saturday, 8 January 1955. Ten matches were drawn and went to replays, with three of these requiring a second replay. Notable is tie no. 3, between Bury and Stoke City, which went to four replays before Stoke won in the final game, with an aggregated score of 9–10.

Fourth round proper
The matches were scheduled for Saturday, 29 January 1955. Four matches were drawn and went to replays, which were all played in the following midweek match. Once again, there was a tie which went to four replays, this time between Doncaster Rovers and Aston Villa. Rovers finally won the fixture in the fifth match, with an aggregated score of 6–4.

Fifth Round Proper
The matches were scheduled for Saturday, 19 February 1955. Two matches went to replays in the following mid-week fixture, with the Nottingham Forest–Newcastle United match requiring a second replay to settle it in favour of United.

Sixth Round Proper
The four quarter-final ties were scheduled to be played on Saturday, 12 March 1955. The Newcastle United–Huddersfield Town game went to a replay before United went through.

Semi-finals
The semi-final matches were played on Saturday, 26 March 1955, with the Newcastle United–York City match replaying on the 30th. Newcastle and Manchester City won their ties to meet in the final at Wembley.

Replay

Final

The 1955 FA Cup Final was contested by Newcastle United and Manchester City at Wembley. Newcastle won 3–1, with goals from Jackie Milburn in the first minute (after 45 seconds, setting a new record in a final at Wembley, which was held until 1997), Bobby Mitchell and George Hannah. Bobby Johnstone scored City's goal.

Match details

References
General
The FA Cup Archive at TheFA.com
F.A. Cup results 1954/55 at Footballsite
Specific

 
FA Cup seasons